Laëtizia Penmellen (born 15 September 1994) is a French model and beauty pageant titleholder. 
When she was 19 years old, she finished second runner up in Miss France 2014 election and was selected to compete at the Miss Earth 2014 pageant.

Biography

Miss France 2014
Laëtizia decided to compete in Miss France 2014 and represented her hometown, Provence. At the conclusion of the pageant, she was placed as the second runner up.

The national pageant of France was won by Flora Coquerel who was France's representative for Miss World 2014 in London.

Miss Earth 2014

By obtaining Miss Earth France, Laëtizia flew to the Philippines in November to compete with almost 100 other candidates to be Alyz Henrich's successor as Miss Earth.

As a Miss Earth delegate, an environmental advocacy is must. When she was asked about her advocacy for the pageant, she mentioned climate change as her choice of topic. She continued answering by saying, "But I will talk about several topics such as those below because everything is interconnected."

About what she can promote about her country, Laëtizia replied, "I know that French people are not known to be the most warmhearted people in this world but France is worth a visit for its landscapes as varied as its people, cooking terroirs in respect of the environment, and culture in every region of France."

She was one of the favourites but had to pull out of the competition 3 days before it started because of a virus. The Miss Earth 2014 was won by Jamie Herrell of the Philippines.

References

External links
 Official Website
 Laëtizia at Miss Earth Official Website
 Miss Earth France 2014 Eco-Beauty Video

Miss Earth 2014 contestants
Living people
People from Provence
1994 births